The Future of What is the third studio album by the American post-hardcore band Unwound, released on April 24, 1995 by Kill Rock Stars. The album was recorded in December 1994 at John and Stu's in Seattle, Washington.

Recording and release 
The Future of What was recorded in December 1994 at John and Stu's in Seattle, Washington and released on April 24, 1995 by the independent record label Kill Rock Stars. The album cover features an illustration by Ukrainian constructivist artist Yakov Chernikhov. The CD and digital versions of the album included 4 extra tracks which were excluded from the vinyl due to length.

Critical reception 

In a favorable review, AllMusic's John Bush commented: "Taking their punk heritage from the Buzzcocks, Unwound write grinding, but tuneful songs. Most tracks rumble with a wandering bass while guitar fuzz coats the works. The vocals are intense, usually screamed. One atypical touch is the closer, a hypnotic quasi-ambient organ piece". In a mixed review, Jem Aswad of CMJ New Music Monthly praised the opening track, but criticized the album's consistency. The album's title inspired the name of Brooklyn synth band Future of What.

Track listing

Personnel
Steve Fisk – Producer, Optigan
John Goodmanson – Engineer
Sara Lund – Drums
Vern Rumsey – Bass
Justin Trosper – Guitar
Kathi Wilcox – Photography

References

External links 

Unwound albums
1995 albums
Albums produced by Steve Fisk
Kill Rock Stars albums